Douglas Bruce Green (born March 20, 1946), better known by his stage name Ranger Doug, is an American musician, arranger, award-winning Western music songwriter, and Grand Ole Opry member best known for his work with Western music and the group Riders in the Sky in which he plays guitar and sings lead and baritone vocals. He is also an exceptionally accomplished yodeler.  With the Riders, he is billed as "Ranger Doug — The Idol of American Youth" and "Governor of the Great State of Rhythm". He is also a member of The Time Jumpers.

Biography
Green graduated from Cranbrook in 1964, and the University of Michigan in 1968. He has a master's degree in Literature from Vanderbilt University in Nashville, Tennessee.  He continues to write as a music historian.  His 2002 Vanderbilt University Press book "Singing in the Saddle" was the first comprehensive look at the singing cowboy phenomenon that swept the United States in the 1930s. In addition, he hosts "Ranger Doug's Classic Cowboy Corral" satellite radio show, delving into his personal vintage cowboy music collection.  The show features the music of such classic western performers as Gene Autry, Roy Rogers, Tex Ritter, Rex Allen, and the Sons of the Pioneers, as well as more obscure recordings.  Green provides commentary with fellow Rider in the Sky Fred LaBour (stand-up bassist stage-named Too Slim) in the role of Ranger Doug's sidekick, the crusty old trail cook called Sidemeat.  The show currently airs Fridays at 11pm ET, Saturdays at 8pm ET, and Sundays at 9am ET, on Sirius/XM's Willie's Roadhouse Channel SiriusXM56.

Prior to forming Riders in the Sky, he performed with The Boys from Shiloh, The Shinbone Alley All Stars, and The Doug Green Band.  In 1967 and 1969 he worked two stints with Bill Monroe's Blue Grass Boys  and one with Jimmy Martin in 1969.  He recorded two albums in 1972 with Vic Jordan and the Buck White Family, one of gospel songs (In God's Eyes) and one traditional bluegrass named after his daughters Liza Jane and Sally Anne.  Green has also recorded the solo album Songs of the Sage.

References

External links
 Riders in the Sky website

American country singer-songwriters
1946 births
Yodelers
Living people
University of Michigan alumni
Vanderbilt University alumni
Music historians
People from Great Lakes, Illinois
Singer-songwriters from Illinois
Country musicians from Illinois